Miguel Tobón (born 22 June 1968) is a former professional tennis player from Colombia. He was born in Medellín but completed his education in the United States. His brother Omar Tobón is a tennis coach in Medellín. He was chosen to serve a second time of the Colombian Davis Cup team by Federación Colombiana de Tenis in 2011.

Career
Tobon was a semi-finalist at the Bancolombia Open in 1994. The Colombian did better the following year, defeating three top 100 players, Javier Frana, Karim Alami and Fernando Meligeni, en route to the final. He won the first set of the final, against Nicolas Lapentti, but lost the match.

From 1987 to 2001, Tobon took part in a record 23 ties for the Colombia Davis Cup team. He played in 50 rubbers, of which he won 24. His 12 doubles wins is a national record, shared with Mauricio Hadad.

ATP career finals

Singles: 1 (1 loss)

Challenger titles

Doubles: (1)

References

External links
 
 
 

1968 births
Living people
Colombian male tennis players
Sportspeople from Medellín
Colombian tennis coaches
20th-century Colombian people
21st-century Colombian people